OPEN Magazine  was a quarterly city and lifestyle magazine focusing upon fashion, style, entertainment, dining and culture for the Fargo, North Dakota and Moorhead, Minnesota metropolitan areas. Feature articles generally cover local people, businesses, restaurants, entertainment, sports, home and travel.

History and profile
OPEN Magazine was launched in May 2007.  In January 2008 the publication was awarded the Fargo Human Relations Award from the city of Fargo for its efforts to expand awareness of diverse communities within the city.  In addition publisher, Christopher Mohs, was awarded the 2008 North Dakota Small Business Journalist of the Year Award from the U.S. Small Business Administration for the efforts of OPEN Magazine and its impact on small businesses in the region.

Each issue of OPEN Magazine reached an estimated 120,000 readers and included four main feature articles (typically two female, two male and at least one individual representing a diverse or ethnic group in the community).  The magazine's departments covered sports, city, food, travel, health, history, social occasions and home.  OPEN Magazine also included an entertainment listing and restaurant guide.

OPEN Magazine was published by Fargo-based media company FrostFire Media Corporation

Production of OPEN Magazine and its sister publication Fargo Business Magazine was discontinued in the fall of 2009, largely a result of the economic impact of the spring floods that hit the metro area that year and greater impacts effecting print publications nationally at the time. Its parent company FrostFire Media Corporation still exists as a holding company based in Minneapolis, Minnesota.

Editorial and artistic staff (as of 2008)
 Merrie Sue Holtan (Managing editor)
 Phil Lowe (Art director)
 Rachael Hammarback (Fashion & lifestyle editor)
 Maren Marks (Restaurant and bar editor)
 Nathan Cote (Photography director)

Awards
 Fargo Human Relations Award
 2008 North Dakota Small Business Journalist of the Year Award (Christopher Mohs)

Notable local contributors
 Tracy Briggs
 Najla Amundson
 Jodee Bock

Advertisers
A look at OPEN magazine's advertisers gives an idea of its target audience. A typical issue reveals a preponderance of ads for high-end businesses as well as generally affordable product venues. Examples of full-page ads for the following:

See also
 Media in Fargo-Moorhead

References

External links
 Official website (U.S.)

2007 establishments in North Dakota
2009 disestablishments in the United States
Lifestyle magazines published in the United States
Quarterly magazines published in the United States
Defunct magazines published in the United States
Fargo–Moorhead
Magazines established in 2007
Magazines disestablished in 2009
Magazines published in North Dakota